Dimethylamine-corrinoid protein Co-methyltransferase (mtbB (gene), dimethylamine methyltransferase) is an enzyme with systematic name dimethylamine:5-hydroxybenzimidazolylcobamide Co-methyltransferase. This enzyme catalyses the following chemical reaction

 dimethylamine + [Co(I) dimethylamine-specific corrinoid protein]  [methyl-Co(III) dimethylamine-specific corrinoid protein] + methylamine

This enzyme is involved in methanogenesis from dimethylamine.

References

External links 
 

EC 2.1.1